Andrzej Niedzielan (born 27 February 1979) is a Polish former professional footballer who played as a striker.

Club career

Born in Żary, Niedzielan began his career began in 1997, when he joined Promień Żary. Then he played for Zagłębie Lubin, where he did not impress. He made his Ekstraklasa debut in a 0–2 defeat to Ruch Chorzów on 23 September 1998 and on 23 October that year he scored two goals in a 3–1 victory over Stomil Olsztyn. He finished the 1998–99 season with three goals in eight league appearances. After that season he was loaned to Odra Opole, and subsequently to Chrobry Głogów.

In the spring of 2001 he was transferred to Górnik Zabrze for a nominal fee. At Górnik, Andrzej Niedzielan finally found his stride. After playing for one and a half seasons he was sold to Dyskobolia Grodzisk. At Dyskobolia his career took off, and after one year he received an offer from NEC. After three year at NEC he returned to Poland with Wisła Kraków for two seasons, and on 24 July 2009 signed a contract with Ruch Chorzów. He made his debut for Ruch in a match against Wisła Kraków on 1 August 2009. On 29 August in a 2–0 victory over Polonia Warszawa he scored his first goal for Ruch. On 6 March 2010, he suffered a zygomatic bone injury.

In June 2010 Niedzielan signed a two-year contract with Ekstraklasa side Korona Kielce. He scored his first goal on 7 August in a debut against Zagłębie Lubin. He also scored in the next league matches against Widzew Łódź, Polonia Bytom, Cracovia, Polonia Warszawa, Wisła Kraków and Ruch Chorzów. After 18 rounds he was a leading goalscorer of Ekstraklasa with ten goals.

In July 2011, he signed a one-year contract with Cracovia. In January 2012, Niedzielan left Cracovia after having his contract terminated by mutual consent and later joined Ruch Chorzów where he played in the 2009–10 season. On 8 April 2014, he terminated his contract by mutual consent and announced his retirement from football.

Personal life
In June 2007 he married Kamila.

Career statistics

Club

International goals
Scores and results list Poland's goal tally first, score column indicates score after each Niedzielan goal.

References

External links
 
 

Living people
1979 births
People from Żary
Sportspeople from Lubusz Voivodeship
Association football forwards
Polish footballers
Poland international footballers
Ekstraklasa players
Eredivisie players
Promień Żary players
Zagłębie Lubin players
Odra Opole players
Górnik Zabrze players
Dyskobolia Grodzisk Wielkopolski players
NEC Nijmegen players
Wisła Kraków players
Ruch Chorzów players
Korona Kielce players
MKS Cracovia (football) players
Polish expatriate footballers
Expatriate footballers in the Netherlands
Polish expatriate sportspeople in the Netherlands